Acoustic is an acoustic compilation album by British progressive trance group Above & Beyond, released on 28 January 2014 by Anjunabeats. The album comprises acoustic versions of previously released music, from Group Therapy and Sirens of the Sea.

Track listing

Charts

References

External links
  Acoustic album on iTunes
 Acoustic on Beatport
 Acoustic album on Anjunabeats store

2014 compilation albums
Above & Beyond (band) albums
Anjunabeats compilation albums